Leitch Massif is a mountain massif that forms the northern part of the West Quartzite Range, in the Concord Mountains of Antarctica.

References

Mountains of Victoria Land
Pennell Coast